Brouviller is a commune in the Moselle department in Grand Est in northeastern France.

History 
The village, belonging to the principality of Lixheim, was reunited with France in 1661 by the Treaty of Vincennes. 

In 2018, Brouviller’s oldest house was destroyed by a fire.

Population

Cultural and historical heritage 
Several Gallo-Roman remains are visible in the commune.

The church Saint-Rémi de Brouviller was built between 1781 and 1782. Three bells created in Nancy were installed in the bell tower in 1809 and replaced in 1922. A painting of Saint Remi, patron saint of the parish, is still in the church.

Notable people linked to the village 
According to Jean-Louis Beaucarnot’s book named Le Dico des politiques, Hillary Clinton had ancestors from Brouviller.

See also
 Communes of the Moselle department

References

External links
 

Communes of Moselle (department)